Eino Kenttä (3 November 1906 – 16 November 1952) was a Finnish athlete. He competed in the men's discus throw at the 1928 Summer Olympics.

References

1906 births
1952 deaths
Athletes (track and field) at the 1928 Summer Olympics
Finnish male discus throwers
Olympic athletes of Finland
Place of birth missing